Marunnattil Oru Malayali is a 1971 Indian Malayalam-language comedy film, directed by A. B. Raj and produced by T. E. Vasudevan. The film stars Prem Nazir, Adoor Bhasi, Prameela and Sankaradi. It was released on 24 September 1971. The film was remade in Telugu as Sri Rajeswarivilas Coffee Club.

Plot

Cast 

Prem Nazir as Mathew/Vilvaadiri Iyer
Vijayasree as Geetha
Adoor Bhasi as Narasimha Iyer
Prameela as Shoshamma
Sankaradi as Sheshadri Iyer
S. P. Pillai as Vittal
Alummoodan as Chandikunju
Paravoor Bharathan as Kariyaachan
Philomina as Mathew's Mother
Sadhana
Paul Vengola
Panjabi
N. Govindankutty
Nellikode Bhaskaran
C. A. Balan
Pala Thankam
Radhamani

Soundtrack 
The music was composed by V. Dakshinamoorthy and the lyrics were written by Sreekumaran Thampi.

References

External links 
 

1970s Malayalam-language films
1971 comedy films
1971 films
Films directed by A. B. Raj
Indian comedy films
Malayalam films remade in other languages